Sandum is a village in Rømskog municipality, Norway. Sandum is one of four districts (grunnkretser) in Rømskog, and had a population of 158 in 2001.

References

Villages in Østfold